IEE may stand for:

 Industrial Electronic Engineers, an aerospace display manufacturer
 Initial Environmental Evaluation, a preliminary environmental impact assessment
 Institute for Energy Efficiency, a research institute at the University of California, Santa Barbara 
 Institute for Energy & Environment, at New Mexico State University
 Institution of Electrical Engineers, a British professional organisation now part of the Institution of Engineering and Technology
 Instituto de Estudos Empresariais, a Brazilian non-profit
 Intuitive Ethical Extrovert, in socionics
 Intelligent Energy Europe, CIP Operational programme

See also
 Institute of Electrical and Electronics Engineers (IEEE)